USS Pensacola (LSD-38) was an  of the United States Navy. She was the fourth Navy ship to be named for the naval town of Pensacola, Florida. She was built at Fore River Shipyard in Quincy, Massachusetts, and commissioned in 1971.

Operational history
In early 1995, the Commanding Officer of USS Pensacola was relieved because the preceding November, the ship had run aground off the East Coast. In 1995, while cruising in the Mediterranean, the ship suffered a major fuel leak, causing the ship to go to General Quarters. The fuel leak was repaired, and no one was injured. In 1996, USS Pensacola ran aground once again while en route to Newport, Rhode Island.
During the 1996 deployment, assisted in the non-combatant evacuation of Albania. During 1999 deployment stood guard during the events that lead to the invasion of Kosovo.

Transfer to the Republic of China in Taiwan
Pensacola was finally decommissioned in 1999, transferred to the Republic of China Navy(ROCN) in Taiwan and redesignated ROCS Hsu Hai (LSD-193).

References 

Anchorage-class dock landing ships
Ships built in Quincy, Massachusetts
1970 ships
Cold War amphibious warfare vessels of the United States
Ships transferred from the United States Navy to the Republic of China Navy
Amphibious warfare vessels of the Republic of China Navy
Amphibious warfare vessels of the Republic of China